North York is a borough, adjacent to the city of York, in York County, Pennsylvania. As of the 2020 census, the borough had a total population of 2,196.

Geography 
North York is located at 39°58'40" North, 76°43'53" West (39.977814, -76.731481). 

Demographics 

As of the census of 2000, there were 1,689 people, 725 households, and 435 families living in the borough. 

The population density was 5,669.1 people per square mile (2,173.8/km2). There were 778 housing units at an average density of 2,611.3 per square mile (1,001.3/km2). 

The racial makeup of the borough was 93.66% White, 2.19% African American, 0.53% Asian, 0.06% Pacific Islander, 1.54% from other races, and 2.01% from two or more races.  Hispanic or Latino of any race were 3.61% of the population.

There were 725 households, out of which 28.8% had children under the age of 18 living with them; 38.2% were married couples living together, 15.3% had a female householder with no husband present, and 39.9% were non-families. 32.7% of all households were made up of individuals, and 11.2% had someone living alone who was 65 years of age or older. 

The average household size was 2.31 and the average family size was 2.91.

In the borough, the population was spread out, with 25.6% under the age of 18, 7.5% from 18 to 24, 33.3% from 25 to 44, 21.1% from 45 to 64, and 12.4% who were 65 years of age or older. The median age was 35 years. 

For every 100 females there were 93.2 males. For every 100 females aged 18 and over, there were 87.7 males.

The median income for a household in the borough was $36,875, and the median income for a family was $41,935. Males had a median income of $30,893 compared with that of $23,567 for females. 

The per capita income for the borough was $16,938.

Roughly 7.5% of families and 9.3% of the population were below the poverty line, including 12.8% of those under the age of 18 and 7.7% of those aged 65 and older.

References

Populated places established in 1888
Boroughs in York County, Pennsylvania
1888 establishments in Pennsylvania